This article lists the in the water and on the water forms of aquatic sports for 2018.

Aquatics (FINA)

International aquatic events
 June 4 – 10: 2018 FINA Diving World Cup in  Wuhan
 3m Springboard winners:  Xie Siyi (m) /  Shi Tingmao (f)
 10m Platform winners:  Chen Aisen (m) /  Zhang Jiaqi (f)
 Synchronized 3m winners:  (Cao Yuan & Xie Siyi) (m) /  (Shi Tingmao & CHANG Yani) (f)
 Synchronized 10m winners:  (Yang Hao & Chen Aisen) (m) /  (Zhang Jiaqi & ZHANG Minjie) (f)
 Mixed Synchronized winners:  (Wang Han & LI Zheng) (3m) /  (Lian Junjie & Si Yajie) (10m)
 Mixed 3m & 10m Team winners:  (Qiu Bo & CHEN Yiwen)
 July 18 – 22: 2018 FINA World Junior Synchronised Swimming Championships in  Budapest
  won all the gold medals available and won the overall medal tally, too. 
 July 23 – 29: 2018 FINA World Junior Diving Championships in  Kyiv
 1m Springboard winners:  WANG Zongyuan (m) /  MA Tong (f)
 3m Springboard winners:  Daniel Restrepo Garcia (m) /  LIN Shan (f)
 10m Platform winners:  LIAN Junjie (m) /  ZHANG Rui (f)
 Synchronized 3m winners:  (Henry McKay & Victor Povzner) (m) /  (MA Tong & ZHANG Rui) (f)
 Synchronized 10m winners:  (LI Zheng & LIAN Junjie) (m) /  (LAI Shiyun & LIU Jialing) (f)
 Mixed Team winners: 
 August 9 – 14: 2018 Pan Pacific Swimming Championships in  Tokyo
  won both the gold and overall medal tallies.
 September 6 – 8: 2018 FINA World Junior Open Water Swimming Championships in  Eilat
 5 km winners:  Aleksandr Stepanov (m) /  Iris Menchini (f)
 7.5 km winners:  Jean-Baptiste Clusman (m) /  Chase Travis (f)
 10 km winners:  Michael Brinegar (m) /  Paula Ruiz Bravo (f)
 Relay (Age 14–16) winners:  (Viktoria Mihalyvari, Mira Szimcsak, Zoltan Tabi, & Szilard Galyassy)
 Open Relay winners:  (Madelon Catteau, Jean-Baptiste Clusman, Lisa Pou, & Enzo Roldan Munoz)
 November 9 & 10: 2018 FINA High Diving World Cup in  Abu Dhabi
 Winners:  Gary Hunt (m) /  Rhiannan Iffland (f)
 December 11 – 16: 2018 FINA World Swimming Championships (25 m) in  Hangzhou
  won both the gold and overall medal tallies.

2018 FINA Marathon Swim World Series
 March 17: MSWS #1 in  Doha
 Winners:  Ferry Weertman (m) /  Sharon van Rouwendaal (f)
 May 20: MSWS #2 in the 
 Winners:  Simone Ruffini (m) /  Arianna Bridi (f)
 June 9: MSWS #3 in  Setúbal
 Winners:  Kristóf Rasovszky (m) /  Haley Anderson (f)
 June 16: MSWS #4 in  Balatonfüred
 Winners:  Florian Wellbrock (m) /  Ana Marcela Cunha (f)
 July 26: MSWS #5 in  Lac Saint-Jean
 Winners:  Marcel Schouten (m) /  Ana Marcela Cunha (f)
 August 11: MSWS #6 in  Lake Mégantic
 Winners:  Christian Reichert (m) /  Xin Xin (f)
 September 16: MSWS #7 in  Chun'an County (Hangzhou)
 Winners:  Jack Burnell (m) /  Xin Xin (f)
 November 24: MSWS #8 (final) in  Abu Dhabi
 Winners:  Florian Wellbrock (m) /  Arianna Bridi (f)

2018 FINA Ultra Marathon Swim Series
 February 4: UMSS #1 in  Coronda
 Winners:  Guillermo Bertola (m) /  Cecilia Biagioli (f)
 July 28: UMSS #2 in  Lac Saint-Jean
 Winners:  Edoardo Stochino (m) /  Barbara Pozzobon (f)
 August 25: UMSS #3 (final) in  Ohrid
 Winners:  Francesco Ghettini (m) /  Barbara Pozzobon (f)

2018 FINA Diving World Series
 March 9 – 11: DWS #1 in  Beijing
 3m Springboard winners:  Xie Siyi (m) /  Shi Tingmao (f)
 10m Platform winners:  Yang Jian (m) /  ZHANG Jiaqi (f)
 Synchronized 3m winners:  (Xie Siyi & Cao Yuan) (m) /  (CHEN Yiwen & Wang Han) (f)
 Synchronized 10m winners:  (Chen Aisen & Yang Hao) (m) /  (ZHANG Minjie & ZHANG Jiaqi) (f)
 Mixed Synchronized winners:  (LI Zheng & Wang Han) (3m) /  (LIN Shan & LIAN Junjie) (10m)
 March 15 – 17: DWS #2 in  Fuji, Shizuoka
 3m Springboard winners:  Cao Yuan (m) /  Shi Tingmao (f)
 10m Platform winners:  LIAN Junjie (m) /  ZHANG Jiaqi (f)
 Synchronized 3m winners:  (Cao Yuan & Xie Siyi) (m) /  (CHANG Yani & Shi Tingmao) (f)
 Synchronized 10m winners:  (Yang Hao & Chen Aisen) (m) /  (ZHANG Minjie & ZHANG Jiaqi) (f)
 Mixed Synchronized winners:  (LI Zheng & Wang Han) (3m) /  (LIN Shan & LIAN Junjie) (10m)
 April 27 – 29: DWS #3 in  Montreal
 3m Springboard winners:  Cao Yuan (m) /  Shi Tingmao (f)
 10m Platform winners:  Qiu Bo (m) /  Ren Qian (f)
 Synchronized 3m winners:  (Xie Siyi & Cao Yuan) (m) /  (CHANG Yani & Shi Tingmao) (f)
 Synchronized 10m winners:  (Yang Jian & Qiu Bo) (m) /  (Pandelela Rinong & Cheong Jun Hoong) (f)
 Mixed Synchronized winners:  (François Imbeau-Dulac & Jennifer Abel) (3m) /  (Meaghan Benfeito & Nathan Zsombor-Murray) (10m)
 May 4 – 6: DWS #4 (final) in  Kazan
 3m Springboard winners:  Xie Siyi (m) /  Shi Tingmao (f)
 10m Platform winners:  Yang Jian (m) /  Ren Qian (f)
 Synchronized 3m winners:  (Cao Yuan & Xie Siyi) (m) /  (CHANG Yani & Shi Tingmao) (f)
 Synchronized 10m winners:  (Aleksandr Bondar & Viktor Minibaev) (m) /  (LIN Shan & Si Yajie) (f)
 Mixed Synchronized winners:  (Jennifer Abel & François Imbeau-Dulac) (3m) /  (Yulia Timoshinina & Nikita Shleikher) (10m)

2018 FINA Diving Grand Prix
 February 23 – 25: DGP #1 in  Rostock
 3m Springboard winners:  Patrick Hausding (m) /  Huang Xiaohui (f)
 10m Platform winners:  Qiu Bo (m) /  Si Yajie (f)
 Synchronized 3m winners:  (WANG Zong Yuam & HU Zijie) (m) /  (Lena Hentschel & Tina Punzel) (f)
 Synchronized 10m winners:  (Tai Xiaohu & CAO Lizhi) (m) /  (XU Yijin & Si Yajie) (f)
 Mixed Synchronized winners:  (CHEN Yiwen & Tai Xiaohu) (3m) /  (Si Yajie & CAO Lizhi) (10m)
 May 10 – 13: DGP #2 in  Calgary
 3m Springboard winners:  PENG Jianfeng (m) /  CHEN Yiwen (f)
 10m Platform winners:  YU Duan (m) /  LU Wei (f)
 Synchronized 3m winners:  (Philippe Gagné & François Imbeau-Dulac) (m) /  (WU Chunting & CHEN Yiwen) (f)
 Synchronized 10m winners:  (YU Duan & YAO Zelin) (m) /  (LU Wei & ZHU Yanxin) (f)
 Mixed Synchronized winners:  (Frithjof Seidel & Jana Lisa Rother) (3m) /  (Meaghan Benfeito & Nathan Zsombor-Murray) (10m)
 July 6 – 8: DGP #3 in  Bolzano
 3m Springboard winners:  LIU Chengming (m) /  CHEN Yiwen (f)
 10m Platform winners:  Tai Xiaohu (m) /  ZHANG Xiaotong (f)
 Synchronized 3m winners:  (LIU Chengming & PENG Jianfeng) (m) /  (WU Chunting & CHEN Yiwen) (f)
 Synchronized 10m winners:  (Tai Xiaohu & HUANG Bowen) (m) /  (ZHANG Xiaotong & JIAO Jingjing) (f)
 Mixed Synchronized winners:  (Alison Gibson & Greg Duncan) (3m) /  (Noemi Batki & Maicol Verzotto) (10m)
 July 13 – 15: DGP #4 in  Madrid
 3m Springboard winners:  Juan Manuel Celaya Hernandez (m) /  CHEN Yiwen (f)
 10m Platform winners:  Tai Xiaohu (m) /  Samantha Bromberg (f)
 Synchronized 3m winners:  (Yahel Castillo & Juan Manuel Celaya Hernandez) (m) /  (WU Chunting & CHEN Yiwen) (f)
 Synchronized 10m winners:  (Tai Xiaohu & HUANG Bowen) (m) /  (ZHANG Xiaotong & JIAO Jingjing) (f)
 November 9 – 11: DGP #5 in  Kuala Lumpur
 3m Springboard winners:  Ooi Tze Liang (m) /  MA Tong (f)
 10m Platform winners:  YU Duan (m) /  XU Yijin (f)
 Synchronized 3m winners:  (Muhammad Syafiq Puteh & Ooi Tze Liang) (m) /  (Loh Zhiayi Loh & ONG Ker Ying) (f; default)
 Men's Synchronized 10m winners:  (WANG Zewei & YU Duan)
 November 15 – 18: DGP #6 in  Gold Coast, Queensland
 3m Springboard winners:  Kevin Chávez (m) /  Huang Xiaohui (f)
 10m Platform winners:  Nikita Shleikher (m) /  Emily Boyd (f)
 Synchronized 3m winners:  (Andrzej Rzeszutek & Kacper Lesiak) (m) /  (Georgia Sheehan & Esther Qin) (f)
 Men's Synchronized 10m winners:  (Aleksandr Belevtsev & Nikita Shleikher) (m; default)
 Mixed Synchronized winners:  (Anabelle Smith & Domonic Bedggood) (3m) /  (Christina Wassen & Florian Fandler) (10m; default)
 November 23 – 25: DGP #7 (final) in 
 3m Springboard winners:  Sergey Nazin (m) /  Huang Xiaohui (f)
 10m Platform winners:  Jonathan Chan (m) /  Rin Kaneto (f)
 Synchronized 3m winners:  (Timothy Han-Kuan Lee & Mark Han-Ming Lee) (m) /  (Vitaliia Koroleva & Uliana Kliueva) (f; default)
 Synchronized 10m winners:  (Iván García & Germán Sánchez) (m) /  (KIM A Rim & KIM Jong Gyong) (f) 
 Mixed Synchronized winners:  (Ilia Molchanov & Vitaliia Koroleva) (3m) /  (KIM A Rim & RI Kwon Hyok) (10m; default)

2018 FINA Artistic Swimming World Series
 March 9 – 11: ASWS #1 in  Paris
 Solo Technical/Free winners:  Varvara Subbotina /  Svetlana Kolesnichenko
 Duet Technical/Free winners:  (Svetlana Kolesnichenko & Varvara Subbotina) /  (Wang Liuyi & Wang Qianyi)
 Team Technical/Free winners:  / 
 Mixed Duet Technical/Free winners:  (Manila Flamini & Giorgio Minisini) /  (Aleksandr Maltsev & Mayya Gurbanberdieva)
 Free Combinations winners: 
 Team Highlights winners: 
 April 20 – 22: ASWS #2 in  Beijing
 Solo Technical/Free winners:  Nada Daabousová /  Khonzodakhon Toshkhujaeva
 Duet Technical/Free winners:  (Jiang Tingting & Jiang Wenwen) (both)
 Team Technical/Free winners:  (both)
 Mixed Duet Technical/Free winners:  (SHI Haoyu & Zhang Yiyao) (both & default)
 Free Combinations winners: 
 Team Highlights winners: 
 April 27 – 30: ASWS #3 in  Tokyo
 Solo Technical/Free winner:  Yukiko Inui (both)
 Duet Technical/Free winners:  (Kanami Nakamaki & Yukiko Inui) (both)
 Team Technical/Free winners:  (both)
 Mixed Duet Technical/Free winners:  (Manila Flamini & Giorgio Minisini) (both)
 Free Combinations winners:  (default)
 Team Highlights winners: 
 May 11 – 13: ASWS #4 in  Šamorín
 Solo Technical/Free winner:  Linda Cerruti (both)
 Duet Technical/Free winners:  (Costanza Ferro & Linda Cerruti) (both)
 Team Technical/Free winners:  / 
 Mixed Duet Technical/Free winners:  (Nayara Maria Pena & Ibon Garcia) (both & default)
 Free Combinations winners: 
 Team Highlights winners:  (default)
 May 18 – 20: ASWS #5 in  Budapest
 Solo Technical/Free winner:  Varvara Subbotina (both)
 Duet Technical/Free winners:  (Yelyzaveta Yakhno & Anastasiya Savchuk) (both)
 Team Technical/Free winners:  (both)
 Free Combinations winners: 
 Team Highlights winners: 
 May 25 – 27: ASWS #6 in  Madrid
 Solo Technical/Free winner:  Vivienne Koch (both)
 Duet Technical/Free winners:  (Sara Saldana Lopez & Paula Ramirez) (both)
 Team Technical/Free winners:  (both)
 Mixed Duet Technical/Free winners:  (Pau Ribes & Berta Ferreras Sanz) (both -> Free event won by default)
 Free Combinations winners: 
 May 31 – June 2: ASWS #7 in  Surrey, British Columbia
 Solo Technical/Free winner:  Yukiko Inui (both)
 Duet Technical/Free winners:  (Kanami Nakamaki & Yukiko Inui) (both)
 Team Technical/Free winners:  (both)
 Mixed Duet Technical winner:  (LEE Ga-bin & BYUN Jae-jun) (default)
 Free Combinations winners: 
 Team Highlights winners: 
 June 7 – 9: ASWS #8 in  Los Angeles
 Solo Technical/Free winner:  Yelyzaveta Yakhno (both)
 Duet Technical/Free winners:  (Jiang Tingting & Jiang Wenwen) (both)
 Team Technical/Free winners:  (both)
 Mixed Duet Technical/Free winners:  (Manila Flamini & Giorgio Minisini) (both)
 Free Combinations winners: 
 Team Highlights winners: 
 June 15 – 17: ASWS #9 in  Syros
 Solo Technical/Free winner:  Joana Betzabe Jimenez Garcia /  Nuria Diosdado
 Duet Technical/Free winners:  (Karem Achach & Nuria Diosdado) (both)
 Team Technical/Free winners:  (both)
 Mixed Duet Technical/Free winners:  (Manila Flamini & Giorgio Minisini) /  (Mayya Gurbanberdieva & Aleksandr Maltsev)
 Free Combinations winners: 
 Team Highlights winners: 
 June 29 – July 1: ASWS #10 (final) in  Tashkent
 Solo Technical/Free winner:  Joana Betzabe Jimenez Garcia /  Nuria Diosdado
 Duet Technical/Free winners:  (Karem Achach & Nuria Diosdado) (both with Joana Betzabe Jimenez Garcia in free event only)
 Team Technical/Free winners:  (both)
 Mixed Duet Technical/Free winners:  (Sofiya Lyakh & Olzhas Makhanbetiyarov) /  (Dinara Ibragimova & Vyacheslav Rudnev)
 Free Combinations winners: 
 Team Highlights winners:

2018 FINA Swimming World Cup
 September 7 – 9: SWC #1 in  Kazan
  won both the gold and overall medal tallies.
 September 13 – 15: SWC #2 in  Doha
  won the gold medal tally.  won the overall medal tally.
 September 28 – 30: SWC #3 in  Eindhoven
  won both the gold and overall medal tallies.
 October 4 – 6: SWC #4 in  Budapest
  won the gold medal tally.  won the overall medal tally.
 November 2 – 4: SWC #5 in  Beijing
  won both the gold and overall medal tallies.
 November 9 – 11: SWC #6 in  Tokyo
  won the gold medal tally.  won the overall medal tally.
 November 15 – 17: SWC #7 (final) in 
  won the gold medal tally.  won the overall medal tally.

Canoeing

Canoe sprint

International canoe sprint championships
 February 9 – 11: 2018 Oceania Canoe Sprint Championships in  Penrith
 For results, click here.
 June 8 – 10: 2018 Canoe Sprint European Championships in  Belgrade
  won both the gold and overall medal tallies.
 June 28 – July 1: 2018 European Junior & U23 Canoe Sprint Championships in  Auronzo
 Junior:  won the gold medal tally. Belarus, &  won 8 overall medals each.
 U23:  &  won 3 gold and 7 overall medals each. 
 July 26 – 29: 2018 ICF Junior and U23 Canoe Sprint World Championships in  Plovdiv
 Junior:  won both the gold and overall medal tallies.
 U23:  and  won 4 gold medals each. Hungary, Germany, and  won 6 overall medals each.
 August 10 – 12: 2018 World University Canoe Sprint Championship in  Szolnok
  won the gold medal tally.  won the overall medal tally. 
 August 22 – 26: 2018 ICF Canoe Sprint World Championships in  Montemor-o-Velho
  won both the gold and overall medal tallies.
 September 13 – 16: 2018 Pan American Canoe Sprint Championship in  Dartmouth
 Senior:  won both the gold and overall medal tallies.
 Junior:  won both the gold and overall medal tallies.

2018 Canoe Sprint World Cup
 May 18 – 20: CSWC #1 in  Szeged
Hungary won the overall medal tally.
 Note: For detailed results, click here.
 May 25 – 27: CSWC #2 (final) in  Duisburg
  won both the gold and overall medal tallies.
 Note: For detailed results, click here.

Canoe slalom

International canoe slalom championships
 January 27 – 29: 2018 Oceania Canoe Slalom Championships in  Auckland
 K1 winners:  Lucien Delfour (m) /  Kateřina Kudějová (f)
 C1 winners:  Kilian Foulon (m) /  Jessica Fox (f)
 June 1 – 3: 2018 European Canoe Slalom Championships in  Prague
 C1 winners:  Ryan Westley (m) /  Viktoria Wolffhardt (f)
 C1 team winners:  (m) /  (f)
 Men's C2 winners:  (Jonáš Kašpar & Marek Šindler)
 Men's C2 team winners: 
 K1 winners:  Peter Kauzer (m) /  Ricarda Funk (f)
 K1 team winners:  (m) /  (f)
 July 17 – 22: 2018 World Junior and U23 Canoe Slalom Championships in  Ivrea
  won both the gold and overall medal tallies.
 August 15 – 19: 2018 European Junior and U23 Canoe Slalom Championships in  Bratislava
  and  won 4 gold medals each. Czech Republic won the overall medal tally.
 September 26 – 30: 2018 ICF Canoe Slalom World Championships in  Rio de Janeiro
 C1 winners:  Franz Anton (m) /  Jessica Fox (f)
 C1 team winners:  (m) /  (f)
 K1 winners:  Hannes Aigner (m) /  Jessica Fox (f)
 K1 team winners:  (m) /  (f)
 Extreme K1 winners:  Christian de Dionigi (m) /  Ana Sátila (f)
 Mixed C2 winners:  (Marcin Pochwała & Aleksandra Stach)

2018 Canoe Slalom World Cup
 June 22 – 24: #1 in  Liptovský Mikuláš
 C1 winners:  Sideris Tasiadis (m) /  Jessica Fox (f)
 C2 Mixed Team winners:  (Sona Stanovska & Ján Bátik)
 K1 winners:  Sebastian Schubert (m) /  Jessica Fox (f)
 Extreme K1 winners:  Pavel Eigel (m) /  Sage Donnelly (f)
 June 29 – July 1: #2 in  Kraków
 C1 winners:  David Florence (m) /  Jessica Fox (f)
 Mixed Team C2 winners:  (Tereza Fišerová & Jakub Jáně)
 K1 winners:  Joe Clarke (m) /  Jessica Fox (f)
 Extreme K1 winners:  Nikita Gubenko (m) /  Polina Mukhgaleeva (f)
 July 6 – 8: #3 in  Augsburg
 C1 winners:  Sideris Tasiadis (m) /  Jessica Fox (f)
 C2 Mixed Team winners:  (Jasmin Schornberg & Thomas Becker)
 K1 winners:  Peter Kauzer (m) /  Jessica Fox (f)
 Extreme K1 winners:  Pavel Eigel (m) /  Ana Sátila (f)
 August 31 – September 2: #4 in  Tacen
 Note: The Women's C1 and Men's K1 final results came from Friday's heats of those events. C1 winners:  Sideris Tasiadis (m) /  Jessica Fox (f)
 C2 Mixed Team winners:  (Veronika Vojtová & Jan Mašek)
 K1 winners:  Žan Jakše (m) /  Corinna Kuhnle (f)
 September 7 – 9: #5 (final) in  La Seu d'Urgell
 C1 winners:  Luka Božič (m) /  Jessica Fox (f)
 Mixed Team C2 winners:  (Tereza Fišerová & Jakub Jáně)
 K1 winners:  Giovanni De Gennaro (m) /  Ricarda Funk (f)

Other international canoeing events
 May 31 – June 3: 2018 ICF Wildwater Canoeing World Championships in  Muotathal
 For detailed results, click here.
 July 5 – 8: 2018 European Canoe Marathon Championships in  Metković
 Senior
 C1 winners:  Manuel Campos (m) /  Liudmyla Babak (f)
 Men's C2 winners:  (Diego Romero & Oscar Graña)
 K1 winners:  José Ramalho (m) /  Renáta Csay (f)
 K2 winners:  (Adrián Boros & László Solti) (m) /  (Vanda Kiszli & Sára Mihalik) (f)
 Junior
 Junior C1 winners:  Jordán Fajta (m) /  Dóra Horányi (f)
 Junior Men's C2 winners:  (Zoltán Vass & Bence Bucsi)
 Junior K1 winners:  Ronan Foley (m) /  Emma Russell (f)
 Junior K2 winners:  (Marcell Mercz & Ádám Horváth) (m) /  (Viktória Tófalvi & Csilla Rugási) (f)
 U23
 Men's U23 C1 winner:  Mateusz Borgiel
 U23 K1 winners:  Nico Paufler (m) /  Zsófia Czéllai-Vörös (f)
 August 1 – 5: 2018 ICF Canoe Polo World Championships in  Welland
 Men:  defeated , 4–1, in the final.  took third place.
 Women:  defeated , 3–1, in the final.  took third place.
 U21 Men:  defeated , 3–2, in the final.  took third place.
 U21 Women:  defeated , 5–1, in the final.  took third place.
 August 30 – September 2: 2018 ICF Stand-Up Paddling World Championships in  Esposende & Viana do Castelo (debut event)
 Event cancelled, due to a court order in Portugal. September 6 – 9: 2018 ICF Canoe Marathon World Championship in  Prado Vila Verde
 C1 winners:  Manuel Campos (m) /  Liudmyla Babak (f)
 Men's C2 winners:  (Diego Romero & Oscar Graña)
 K1 winners:  Andrew Birkett (m) /  Vanda Kiszli (f)
 K2 winners:  (Andrew Birkett & Hank McGregor) (m) /  (Renáta Csay & Zsófia Czéllai-Vörös) (f)
 Junior C1 winners:  Dávid Hodován (m) /  Marlee MacIntosh (f)
 Junior K1 winners:  Thorbjørn Rask (m) /  Zsóka Csikós (f)
 Junior K2 winners:  (Thorbjørn Rask & Nikolai Thomsen) (m) /  (Olga Bakó & Emese Kohalmi) (f)
 Men's U23 C1 winner:  Sérgio Maciel
 U23 K1 winners:  Jon Vold (m) /  Zsófia Czéllai-Vörös (f)
 September 13 – 16: 2018 ICF Dragon Boat World Championships in  Gainesville, Georgia
 For detailed results, click here.

Rowing

International rowing events
 May 26 & 27: 2018 European Rowing Junior Championships in  Gravelines
  won the gold medal tally.  won the overall medal tally.
 July 25 – 29: 2018 World Rowing Under 23 Championships in  Poznań
  won the gold medal tally.  won the overall medal tally.
 August 2 – 5: 2018 European Rowing Championships in  Glasgow
  won the gold medal tally. Romania and  won 7 overall medals each.
 August 8 – 12: 2018 World Rowing Junior Championships in  Račice
 Five national teams won 2 gold medals each.  won the overall medal tally. 
 August 10 – 12: 2018 World University Rowing Championships in  Shanghai
  won the gold medal tally.  won the overall medal tally.
 September 1 & 2: 2018 European Rowing Under 23 Championships in  Brest
  won the gold medal tally. Romania and  won 8 overall medals each.
 September 9 – 16: 2018 World Rowing Championships in  Plovdiv
The United States won the overall medal tally.
 September 26 – 30: 2018 World Rowing Masters Regatta in  Sarasota-Bradenton
 For detailed results, click here.

2018 World Rowing Cup
 June 1 – 3: #1 in  Belgrade
  won both the gold and overall medal tallies.
 June 22 – 24: #2 in  Linz-Ottensheim
  won the gold medal tally.  won the overall medal tally.
 July 13 – 15: #3 (final) in  Lucerne
  won the gold medal tally.  won the overall medal tally.

Sailing

International sailing events
 August 20, 2017 – July 28: Clipper Round the World Yacht Race, starting and finishing in  Liverpool
 Winner:  Sanya Serenity Coast (Skipper:  Wendy Tuck)
 October 14, 2017 – June 30: 2017–18 Volvo Ocean Race, starting in  Alicante and finishing in  The Hague
 Winners:  Dongfeng Race Team (Skipper:  Charles Caudrelier)
 June 18 – 25: 2018 Asian Sailing Championship in  Jakarta
  won both the gold and overall medal tallies.
 July 14 – 21: 2018 Youth Sailing World Championships in  Corpus Christi, Texas
  won both the gold and overall medal tallies.
 July 30 – August 12: 2018 Sailing World Championships in  Aarhus
  won the gold medal tally.  won 7 overall medals.
 September 1 – 5: 2018 World University Sailing Championship in  Cherbourg
 Winners:  (Skipper: Thomas Grimes) (m) /  (Skipper: Elodie Bonafous) (f)

2018 Sailing World Cup
 October 15 – 22, 2017: SWC #1 in  Gamagōri
  won the gold medal tally.  won the overall medal tally.
 January 21 – 28: SWC #2 in  Miami
  won both the gold and overall medal tallies.
 April 22 – 29: SWC #3 in  Hyères
  won both the gold and overall medal tallies.
 June 3 – 10: SWC #4 (final) in  Marseille
 Eight different team won a gold medal each.

2018 Extreme Sailing Series
 March 14 – 17: Act 1 in  Muscat
 Champions:  Alinghi; Second:  SAP Extreme Sailing Team; Third:  Oman Air
 May 24 – 27: Act 2 (GC32 World Championship) in  Riva del Garda
 Champions:  SAP Extreme Sailing Team; Second:  Oman Air; Third:  INEOS Rebels UK
 June 14 – 17: Act 3 in  Barcelona
 Champions:  Alinghi; Second:  Oman Air; Third:  SAP Extreme Sailing Team
 July 5 – 8: Act 4 in  Cascais
 Champions:  Alinghi; Second:  SAP Extreme Sailing Team; Third:  INEOS Rebels UK
 August 24 – 27: Act 5 in  Cardiff
 Champions:  Alinghi; Second:  SAP Extreme Sailing Team; Third:  Oman Air
 October 18 – 21: Act 6 in  San Diego
 Champions:  Oman Air; Second:  Alinghi; Third:  SAP Extreme Sailing Team
 November 29 – December 2: Act 7 (final) in  Los Cabos
 Champions:  Alinghi; Second:  Red Bull Sailing Team; Third:  Oman Air

Surfing

ISA
 January 19 – 25: 2018 ISA World Longboard Surfing Championship in  Wanning
 Open winners:  Kai Sallas (m) /  Tory Gilkerson (f)
 Aloha Cup winners:  
 Team points winners: 
 September 15 – 22: 2018 ISA World Surfing Games in  Tahara, Aichi
 Open winners:  Santiago Muñiz (m) /  Sally Fitzgibbons (f)
 Aloha Cup winners: 
 Team points winners: 
 October 27 – November 4: 2018 ISA World Junior Surfing Championship in  Huntington Beach
 Boys' winners:  Keanu Kamiyama (U18) /  Grayson Hinrichs (U16)
 Girls' winners:  Rachel Presti (U18) /  Caitlin Simmers (U16)
 Aloha Cup winners: 
 Team points winners: 
 November 23 – December 2: 2018 ISA World SUP and Paddleboard Championship in  Wanning
 SUP Surfing winners:  Luiz Diniz (m) /  Shakira Westdorp (f)
 SUP Distance Racing winners:  Michael Booth (m) /  Olivia Piana (f)
 Paddle Distance Racing winners:  Hunter Pflueger (m) /  Grace Rosato (f)
 SUP Tech Racing winners:  Daniel Hasulyo (m) /  Candice Appleby (f)
 Paddle Tech Racing winners:  Lachie Lansdown (m) /  Grace Rosato (f)
 Team Relay Race winners:  (Lachie Lansdown, Terrene Black, Grace Rosato, & Harry Maskell)
 Junior winners:  Ryan Funk (m) /  Jade Howson (f)
 Sprint Race winners:  Arthur Carvalho (m) /  Amandine Chazot (f)
 Team Points winners: 
 December 12 – 16: 2018 ISA World Adaptive Surfing Championship in  La Jolla
  and  won 2 gold medals each. Brazil and  won 5 overall medals each.
 Team Points winners: 1. , 2. , 3. 

2018 World Surf League
 March 11 – 22:  Quiksilver Pro Gold Coast 2018
 Winners:  Julian Wilson (m) /  Lakey Peterson (f)
 March 28 – April 8:  Rip Curl Pro 2018
 Winners:  Italo Ferreira (m) /  Stephanie Gilmore (f)
 April 11 – 22:  Margaret River Pro 2018
 Event cancelled, due to shark and safety concerns. May 11 – 20:  Oi Rio Pro 2018
 Winners:  Filipe Toledo (m) /  Stephanie Gilmore (f)
 May 27 – June 9:  Bali Pro Keramas 2018
 Winners:  Italo Ferreira (m) /  Lakey Peterson (f)
 July 3 – 16:  J-Bay Open 2018
 Winner:  Filipe Toledo (m) /  Stephanie Gilmore (f)
 July 30 – August 5:  Vans US Open of Surfing 2018 (Women only)
 Winner:  Courtney Conlogue
 August 10 – 21:  Billabong Pro Teahupoo 2018 (Men only)
 Winner:  Gabriel Medina
 September 5 – 9:  Surf Ranch Lemoore 2018
 Winners:  Gabriel Medina (m) /  Carissa Moore (f)
 October 3 – 14:  Quiksilver Pro France 2018
 Winners:  Julian Wilson (m) /  Courtney Conlogue (f)
 October 16 – 27:  MEO Rip Curl Pro Portugal 2018 (Men only)
 Winner:  Italo Ferreira
 November 25 – December 6:  Maui Women's Pro 2018 (Women only; final)
 Winner:  Carissa Moore
 December 8 – 20:  Billabong Pipeline Masters 2018 (Men only; final)
 Winner:  Gabriel Medina

Water polo

2018 FINA Men's Water Polo World League
 November 14, 2017 – April 10, 2018: 2017–18 FINA Men's European Water Polo Preliminary Rounds
 April 3 – 8: 2018 FINA Men's Intercontinental Water Polo Tournament in  Auckland
 Champions: ; Second: ; Third: ; Fourth: 
 Note: All four teams mentioned above all qualified to compete in the 2018 Superfinal. June 18 – 23: 2018 FINA Men's Water Polo World League Superfinal in  Budapest
  defeated , 13–11, to win their second FINA Men's Water Polo World League title.
  took third place.

2018 FINA Women's Water Polo World League
 November 21, 2017 – May 1, 2018: 2017–18 FINA Women's European Water Polo Preliminary Rounds
 April 3 – 8: 2018 FINA Women's Intercontinental Water Polo Tournament in  Auckland
 Champions: ; Second: ; Third: ; Fourth: ; Fifth: 
 Note: All five teams mentioned above all qualified to compete in the 2018 Superfinal.''
 May 28 – June 2: 2018 FINA Women's Water Polo League Superfinal in  Kunshan
  defeated , 8–6, to win their fifth consecutive and 12th overall FINA Women's Water Polo League title.
  took third place.

World water polo events
 August 11 – 19: 2018 FINA Youth Water Polo World Championships in  Szombathely
  defeated , 9–8, to win their first FINA Youth Water Polo World Championships title.
  took third place.
 August 26 – September 2: 2018 LEN European U19 Water Polo Championship in  Minsk
  defeated , 14–12, to win their first LEN European U19 Water Polo Championship title.
  took third place.
 August 27 – September 2: 2018 FINA World Women's Youth Water Polo Championships in  Belgrade
  defeated , 8–7, to win their first FINA World Women's Youth Water Polo Championship title.
  took third place.
 September 9 – 16: 2018 Women's LEN European U19 Water Polo Championships in  Funchal
  defeated , 12–8, to win their first LEN Women's European U19 Water Polo Championship title.
  took third place.

Ligue Européenne de Natation
 September 14, 2017 – June 9, 2018: 2017–18 LEN Champions League (final eight in  Genoa)
  Olympiacos defeated  Pro Recco, 9–7, to win their second LEN Champions League title.
  CNA Barceloneta took third place.
 September 27, 2017 – April 18, 2018: 2017–18 LEN Euro Cup
  Ferencvárosi TC defeated  Banco BPM SM Busto, 17–13 in a 2-legged final, to win their second consecutive LEN Euro Cup title.
 March 22 – 24: 2018 LEN Women's Europa Cup Super Final in  Pontevedra (debut event)
  defeated , 9–8, to win the inaugural LEN Women's Europa Cup title.
  took third place.
 April 5 – 8: 2018 LEN Men's Europa Cup Super Final in  Rijeka (debut event)
  defeated , 12–9, to win the inaugural LEN Men's Europa Cup title.
  took third place.
 July 14 – 28: 2018 European Water Polo Championship for Men and Women in  Barcelona
 Men:  defeated , 12–10, to win their fourth consecutive and eighth overall Men's European Water Polo Championship title.
  took third place.
 Women:  defeated , 6–4, to win their fifth Women's European Water Polo Championship title.
  took third place.
 November 10: 2018 Women's LEN Super Cup Final in  Kirishi
  Dunaujvaros defeated  Kinef-Surgutneftegas, 4–2 in penalties and after an 11–11 score in regular play, to win their first Women's LEN Super Cup title.
 November 30: 2018 LEN Super Cup for Men Final in  Budapest
  Ferencvárosi defeated  Olympiacos, 4–2 in penalties and after a 7–7 score in regular play, to win their first Men's LEN Super Cup title.

UANA
 May 1 – 9: 2018 UANA Water Polo Cup in  Cochabamba
  defeated  12–6, to win their 1st UANA Water Polo Cup.
  took third place and  too fourth place.

References

External links
 FINA – Fédération Internationale de Natation (International Swimming Federation)
 International Canoe Federation
 World Rowing
 World Sailing
 International Surfing Association
 International Waterski & Wakeboard Federation

 
2018 in sports
Water sports by year
2018 sport-related lists
Aquatics